Prior to its uniform adoption of proportional representation in 1999, the United Kingdom used first-past-the-post for the European elections in England, Scotland and Wales. The European Parliament constituencies used under that system were smaller than the later regional constituencies and only had one Member of the European Parliament each.

The constituency of Wight and Hampshire East was one of them.

It consisted of the Westminster Parliament constituencies of Aldershot, Fareham, Farnham, Gosport, Isle of Wight, Petersfield, Portsmouth North, and Portsmouth South.

Members of the European Parliament

Election results

References

External links
 David Boothroyd's United Kingdom Election Results

European Parliament constituencies in England (1979–1999)
Politics of the Isle of Wight
Politics of Hampshire
1979 establishments in England
1994 disestablishments in England
Constituencies established in 1979
Constituencies disestablished in 1994